George Lishman (1885 – 14 August 1940) was a South African sports shooter. He competed in three events at the 1920 Summer Olympics.

References

External links
 

1885 births
1940 deaths
South African male sport shooters
Olympic shooters of South Africa
Shooters at the 1920 Summer Olympics
Place of birth missing